Baron Éric Alain Robert David de Rothschild (born 3 October 1940) is a French banker.

Early life
Éric de Rothschild was born on 3 October 1940 in New York City. His father was Alain de Rothschild. His uncle was Élie de Rothschild.

Career
He took over the management of Château Lafite Rothschild from his uncle in 1973 and turned it from a "traditional, perhaps not precise, instrument to an artistic, professional one", a move that enabled the vineyard to remain competitive during the 1980s when international wines became more competitive. In 1984, he bought the vineyard château Rieussec.

In 1982, he was managing the de Rothschild bank in Paris with his cousin David René de Rothschild when it was nationalized by François Mitterrand's government.

He is the chairman of the UK Private Banking & Trust. He is on the supervisory board of Paris Orléans, which manages €28.3 billion of assets. From 1994 to 2004, he managed the archives of the bank Rothschild Frères before transferring it to The Rothschild Archive.

Personal life
He is married to Maria-Beatrice Caracciolo di Forino, a painter. He has two sons and one daughter.

He is the honorary president of the Grand Synagogue of Paris.

He has been the chairman of the Mémorial de la Shoah, a museum about The Holocaust in Paris, since 2001. In 2010, with Serge Klarsfeld, he revealed the existence of a document that contained a law project regarding the fate of Jewish people in France, and annotated by the Maréchal Pétain. In 2012, he called for the teaching of the Holocaust in French schools, to combat antisemitism and all forms of racism.

Awards 

 1993: Wine Spectator's Distinguished Service Award
 2006: Southern Wine & Spirits of America Lifetime Achievement Award

References

External links 

 

1940 births
Living people
French bankers
French corporate directors
French philanthropists
20th-century French Jews
Eric
People named in the Panama Papers